In Germanic mythology, Seaxnēat (pronounced ) or Saxnōt was the national god of the Saxons.

Attestation
The Old English form Seaxnēat is recorded in the genealogies of the kings of Essex. The Old Saxon form Saxnōt is attested in the Old Saxon Baptismal Vow along with the gods Uuoden (Woden) and Thunaer (Thor).

The genealogy of the kings of Essex originally placed Seaxnēat at its apex.  It was subsequently modified to make Seaxnēat son of Woden, with the first king of Essex seven generations later:
Woden, Seaxnēat, Gesecg, Andsecg, Swaeppa, Sigefugel, Bedca, Offa, Æscwine  (r. c. 527-587)

Etymology
The name is usually derived from "seax", the eponymous knife which was characteristic of the tribe, and (ge)-not,  (ge)-nēat as "companion" (cognate with German Genosse "comrade"), resulting in a translation of  "sword-companion" (gladii consors, ensifer). This interpretation of the name is due to Jacob Grimm, who identified Saxnot with the god Tiw (Zio).  Grimm's view is more recently endorsed by Chaney (1970), but Simek (2007:276) prefers an identification with Fro, following  Gabriel Turville-Petre (and invoking Georges Dumézil's trifunctional hypothesis).

Swiss linguist Heinrich Wagner (de) proposed that the second element of his name is cognate to Celtic deity Nodens, both from a root meaning 'to get, make use of'.

Parallels
Heinrich Wagner also saw mythological parallels between Saxnot and its proposed cognate Nodens (and Nuada): the word sax may refer to a shortsword, whereas Nuada is the bearer of a flashing sword in Irish mythology; deity Saxnot is revered as the ancestor of the Saxons, while Nuada is "progenitor par excellance".

See also
List of Germanic deities
West Germanic deities

Notes

References

 
 Philippson, E. A.(1929). Germanisches Heidentum bei den Angelsachsen. Leipzig.
 Simek, Rudolf (2007) translated by Angela Hall. Dictionary of Northern Mythology. D.S. Brewer 

Anglo-Saxon gods
Germanic gods